Renan Augusto Lodi dos Santos (born 8 April 1998), known as Renan Lodi, is a Brazilian professional footballer who plays as a left-back for Premier League club Nottingham Forest, on loan from La Liga club Atlético Madrid, and the Brazil national team.

Club career

Athletico Paranaense
Born in Serrana, São Paulo, Lodi joined Athletico Paranaense's youth setup in 2012. He made his first team – and Série A – debut on 14 October 2016, starting in a 1–0 away loss against Grêmio.

Lodi subsequently represented the under-23 in the Campeonato Paranaense, and scored his first senior goal on 25 March 2018, netting the opener in a 5–0 home routing of Maringá. Three days later, he extended his contract until March 2021.

Lodi became a regular starter under new manager Tiago Nunes, and renewed his contract until 2022 on 10 August 2018.

Atlético Madrid

On 28 June 2019, La Liga side Atlético Madrid reached an agreement in principle with Athletico Paranaense for the transfer of Lodi. The deal was completed on 7 July 2019 and Lodi signed a six-year contract with the club.
On 24 November 2019, Lodi scored his first goal for Atlético in a 1–1 draw with Granada. On 16 May 2021, Lodi came on as a substitute and scored a late equalizing goal in the eventual 2–1 home win over Osasuna that would keep the club in the title race against Real Madrid. The following week, as Atlético won the last game in the competition, Lodi became a 2020–21 La Liga champion as part of the team.

On 15 March 2022, Lodi scored his first Champions League goal to help Atlético Madrid beat Manchester United 1–0 at Old Trafford and qualify for the quarter-finals, securing a 2–1 aggregate win.

Nottingham Forest (loan)
On 29 August 2022, Lodi signed for Premier League club Nottingham Forest on a season-long loan deal. He scored his first goal for Nottingham Forest on 9 November 2022 against Tottenham Hotspur in the EFL Cup.

International career
Lodi made his debut for the Brazil national team on 10 October 2019, replacing Alex Sandro in a 1–1 draw with Senegal.

Career statistics

Club

International

Honours
Athletico Paranaense
 Copa Sudamericana: 2018
 Campeonato Paranaense: 2018

Atletico Madrid
 La Liga: 2020–21

References

External links

1998 births
Living people
Footballers from São Paulo (state)
Brazilian footballers
Association football defenders
Club Athletico Paranaense players
Atlético Madrid footballers
Nottingham Forest F.C. players
Campeonato Brasileiro Série A players
La Liga players
Premier League players
Brazil international footballers
2021 Copa América players
Brazilian expatriate footballers
Expatriate footballers in Spain
Brazilian expatriate sportspeople in Spain
Expatriate footballers in England
Brazilian expatriate sportspeople in England